MV or HSC Jean de La Valette (JDLV) is a high-speed catamaran ferry owned and operated by Virtu Ferries. Built by Austal in 2010, it is one of the largest vessels of its kind in the world. The vessel was leased to the Trinidad and Tobago Inter-Island Ferry Service between 2019 and 2021 to serve as an inter-island ferry between Port of Spain and Scarborough. The vessel then returned to Malta to operate on its original route.

Description
When it was built, the Jean de La Valette was the largest high-speed catamaran in the Mediterranean Sea and the second largest in the world.

The vessel is propelled by four Kamewa 125SIII waterjets, and its main engines are four MTU 20V 8000 M71L4 diesel engines.

The vessel could accommodate 24 crew members and 800 passengers. It has two decks, and each includes some outdoor seating. A separate first class area includes lounges and several other amenities. The vessel has a capacity of 230 cars, or 342 truck lane metres and 45 cars. A stern ramp and a port-side ramp allow vehicles to be loaded and unloaded.

Construction

Virtu Ferries ordered the Jean de La Valette in April 2009, in order to allow for an increased amount of passenger and cargo traffic between Malta and Sicily. It was built by Austal in Henderson, Western Australia, and it was fabricated in modular blocks which were then fitted out together, since the vessel was larger than the hall it was constructed in. The vessel was constructed in accordance with Det Norske Veritas safety requirements.

The catamaran was almost complete by March 2010 and it was launched on 25 April, with sea trials commencing in June. It was delivered from Australia to Malta in a two-week voyage under its own power between August and September 2010. During this voyage, the vessel was chased by four pirate skiffs near the Bab-el-Mandeb in the Red Sea, but it easily managed to outrun them.

Career

Malta–Sicily ferry
The vessel commenced operations on 4 October 2010, becoming the flagship of Virtu Ferries and replacing the catamaran  which had been in service since 2006. It operated on the Malta-Pozzallo and Malta-Catania routes, which took 90 minutes and three hours respectively. Multiple trips were made daily, with the vessel making 1006 Malta-Sicily trips in 2017.

The vessel was depicted on a Maltese postage stamp which was issued on 10 August 2011. MaltaPost installed a mailbox on board the catamaran on 7 November 2011, and mail posted there was marked as paquebot.

On 6 August 2015, the catamaran collided into a pier at Pozzallo and it was temporarily out of service for about a week until the necessary repairs were made. The vessel continued to operate the Malta-Sicily route until the larger catamaran  entered into service in March 2019.

Trinidad–Tobago ferry
When the Jean de La Valette ceased operations on the Malta-Sicily route, the vessel underwent a refit at Cádiz in Spain. Meanwhile, Virtu Ferries was declared as the preferred bidder for a tender issued by the Government of Trinidad and Tobago for an inter-island ferry as a temporary replacement for the T&T Express. NIDCO and Port Authority officials visited Malta to examine the vessel in late February 2019, and Virtu Ferries and NIDCO signed the charter party agreement on 16 May 2019. The catamaran is to operate in Trinidad and Tobago for one year until two new ferries arrive in the islands, with the possibility of an extension by a further six months. It is to be crewed and maintained by Virtu Ferries staff from Malta, along with 14 caterers and cleaners from Trinidad and Tobago. The lease of the ferry was controversial, as the opposition party United National Congress questioned the vessel's procurement process and protested at the daily lease cost of €34,500 (approximately equivalent to TT$263,580), which is higher than that of other leased ferries.

The Jean de La Valette left Spain on 14 June, and after a stop in Cape Verde it arrived in Trinidad on 19 June. The catamaran entered service on 18 July 2019. On the return trip after the inaugural voyage, minor technical problems caused the vessel to return to port to undergo repairs. The vessel's route between Port of Spain and Scarborough takes around two and a half to three hours.

During the COVID-19 pandemic in 2020, the vessel's capacity was reduced to 350 passengers in order to allow for social distancing on board.

The lease on the vessel concluded on the 1st of February, 2021 and the vessel was prepared for its return journey to Malta. Meanwhile the government of Trinidad and Tobago thanked Virtu ferries for the 'invaluable' service the vessel provided for the past 18 months.

Return to Malta
In July 2020, whilst the vessel was still under charter to Trinidad and Tobago, Virtu ferries announced that the Malta to Sicily route will be operated by 2 vessels in the first quarter of 2021. This is due to the increased demand of importers/exporters between the islands. The flag ship MV Saint John Paul II will operate from Valletta to Pozzallo while the Jean De La Valette will operate from Valletta to Augusta and/or Catania.

The vessel restarted the Valletta - Pozzallo route on the 6th of April, 2021 with a morning trip leaving Malta at 5:00am.

Notes

References

External links
 

2010 ships
Ships built by Austal
High-speed craft
Individual catamarans
Ferries of Malta
Ferries of Trinidad and Tobago
Ferries of Italy
Virtu Ferries